R. L. Stine's The Haunting Hour: The Series is an original anthology horror-fantasy series that originally aired on Discovery Family. The first two episodes of the series were broadcast on October 29, 2010, with the rest of the season beginning on December 25, 2010. Some episodes in the series are based on stories from R. L. Stine's anthologies The Haunting Hour and Nightmare Hour, while others come from different sources. On December 6, 2014, it was confirmed by Stine via Twitter that Discovery Family dropped the show after its run of four seasons.

Series overview

Episodes

Season 1 (2010–11)

Season 2 (2011–12)

Season 3 (2012–13)

Season 4 (2014)

References

External links
 R. L. Stine's The Haunting Hour on The Hub
 

R. L. Stine's The Haunting Hour
R. L. Stine